Lee Yong (Hanja: 李龍; born 21 January 1989) is a South Korean footballer who plays as defender for Suwon FC.

Club career
Lee was selected in the priority pick of the 2011 K-League Draft by Gwangju FC.

He joined Qatar Stars League side Al-Khor in July 2015.

References

External links 
 
 

1989 births
Living people
South Korean footballers
Association football defenders
South Korean expatriate footballers
Gwangju FC players
Jeju United FC players
Al-Khor SC players
Seongnam FC players
Gangwon FC players
Asan Mugunghwa FC players
K League 1 players
K League 2 players
Qatar Stars League players
Expatriate footballers in Qatar
South Korean expatriate sportspeople in Qatar